Serial Thriller was a roller coaster at two former Six Flags amusement parks:

Thunderhawk (Michigan's Adventure): Known as Serial Thriller at Geauga Lake/Six Flags Worlds of Adventure from 1998-2003
Ednör - L'Attaque: Known as Serial Thriller at Six Flags AstroWorld from 1999-2005